The Battle of Alcolea Bridge was a minor battle that took place on 7 June 1808, during the Peninsular War, at Alcolea, a small village 10 km from Córdoba, the city that would be invaded by French troops later that same afternoon.

Background
The Dos de Mayo Uprising had put Iberia in revolt against French rule.

Battle
It is significant in that it was the first staged battle against regular Spanish troops that General Pierre Dupont de l'Étang fought in Andalusia after having left Toledo on 24 May, heading for Cádiz, with 18,000 troops. Although successive movements of French troops would be harried by Spanish guerrilleros fighting along the way, on both sides of the Sierra Morena and in the steep gorge (defile) of Despeñaperros that separates Castile-La Mancha (including Madrid) and Andalusia, Dupont met with no resistance there.

At Alcolea, some 3,000 regular troops, accompanied by some armed civilians, tried, unsuccessfully, to stop Dupont's vastly superior forces at the bridge over the Guadalquivir and were forced to retreat to Córdoba. Dupont went on to capture Córdoba that same day, his troops ransacking the city over four days.

The seventy troops Dupont had left to protect the bridge were later massacred by guerrillas led by Juan de la Torre, the mayor of the town of Montoro.

One of the Spanish soldiers who fought at Alcolea was Pedro Agustín Girón, who would later become a minister of war, and who would also accuse General Echávarri of not having personally participated.

Aftermath
Iberia in revolt proceeded with the Capture of the Rosily Squadron.

See also
Battle of Bailén
Chronology of events of the Peninsular War
Uprising of Santa Cruz de Mudela
Uprising of Valdepeñas

Notes

References

External links
  Commander in the Marins de la Garde Imperiale

Battles of the Peninsular War
Battles involving Spain
Battles involving France
Battles in Andalusia
Conflicts in 1808
1808 in Spain
June 1808 events